Before Sundown is a 1956 West German drama film directed by Gottfried Reinhardt and starring Hans Albers, Annemarie Düringer and Martin Held. At the 6th Berlin International Film Festival it won the Golden Bear (Audience award). It was adapted from the classic play of the same title by Gerhart Hauptmann.

It was shot at the Spandau Studios in Berlin and on location in Vienna and the Swiss resort town St. Moritz. The film's sets were designed by the art directors Peter Röhrig and Rolf Zehetbauer.

Cast
 Hans Albers as Generaldirektor Mathias Clausen
 Annemarie Düringer as Inken Peters
 Martin Held as Erich Klamroth
 Claus Biederstaedt as Egbert Clausen
 Hannelore Schroth as Ottilie Klamroth, geb. Clausen
 Erich Schellow as Wolfgang Clausen
 Maria Becker as Bettina Clausen
 Johanna Hofer as Frau Peters, Inkens Mutter
 Inge Langen as Paula Clausen, geb. Rübsamen
 Hans Nielsen as Dr. Steynitz, Sanitätsrat
 Reginald Pasch as Diener
 Wolfgang Preiss as Dr. Hahnefeld, Syndikus der Clausen-Werke
 Kurt Vespermann as Wuttke, Fahrer bei Clausen
 Franz Weber as Gärtner

References

Bibliography
 Goble, Alan. The Complete Index to Literary Sources in Film. Walter de Gruyter, 1999.

External links

1956 films
1956 drama films
German drama films
West German films
1950s German-language films
Films based on works by Gerhart Hauptmann
Films directed by Gottfried Reinhardt
German black-and-white films
Films about old age
German films based on plays
Films shot at Spandau Studios
1950s German films